Trachodopalpus is a monotypic moth genus of the family Erebidae. Its only species, Trachodopalpus cinereus, is found in Chile. Both the genus and the species were first described by Émile Blanchard in 1852.

References

Herminiinae
Monotypic moth genera
Endemic fauna of Chile